Long Arm of the Law may refer to:

 "The Long Arm of the Law", a song by Kenny Rogers
 Long Arm of the Law (film), a 1984 Hong Kong film directed by Johnny Mak